ACWA Power is  a developer, investor, co-owner and operator of a portfolio of power generation and desalinated water production plants currently with presence in 10 countries including in the Middle East and North Africa, Southern Africa and South East Asia regions. ACWA Power’s portfolio, with an investment value in excess of USD 33 billion, can generate more than 22 GW of power and produce 2.5 million m3/day of desalinated water to be delivered on a bulk basis to state utilities and industrial majors on long term off-take contracts under Public-Private-Partnership, Concession and Utility Services Outsourcing models (BOO/BOOT). 

Its energy portfolio includes efficient combined cycle power plants, solar (Photovoltaic PV) and Concentrated Solar Power (CSP), geothermal, wind, waste-to-energy (WtE) and coal pollution mitigation.

Background 
Headquartered in Saudi Arabia, ACWA Power maintains regional offices in Dubai, Istanbul, Cairo, Rabat, Johannesburg, Hanoi and Beijing. It invests in, develops, co-owns and operates a portfolio of 32 plants on three continents, with the capacity to generate 22.8GW of power and produce 2.5 million m3/day of desalinated water. ACWA Power and its subsidiary operating companies employ over 3,000 people in projects in 11 different countries.

As of 2014, 8% of ACWA Power's energy portfolio was in renewable energy. ACWA Power has expressed an intention to increase its investment in renewables: of the new bids and projects still in the financing stage announced in 2014 US$7.4 billion of US$15 billion were in renewable energy.

Structure 
ACWA Power's board of directors is chaired by Mohammad Abdullah Abunayyan and Paddy Padmanathan serves as its CEO and President.

History 
In 2002, the Government of the Kingdom of Saudi Arabia changed the regulations so that the private sector was permitted to own and operate utilities such as water and power plants.

The company was founded in its current form in 2008 and succeeded ACWA Power Projects, a joint venture between ACWA Holding (representing the Abunayyan Holding Company and Al-Muhaidib) and the MADA Group for Industrial and Commercial Development founded in 2004 to take advantage of these new private sector investment and operation opportunities in the Saudi Arabian market.

From 2004 to 2011, ACWA Power focused primarily on Saudi Arabia, and was awarded contracts for the Shuqaiq and Marafiq Integrated water and power plants. The company began its current phase of international expansion in 2011 with the acquisition of Central Electricity Generating Company (CEGCO) Jordan and the signature of a joint development agreement for the Kirikkale Combined Cycle Gas Turbine project in Turkey, which subsequently won backing from the European Bank for Reconstruction and Development (EBRD). The company has since expanded throughout the world, although its core holdings remain the MENA region.

In 2020 ACWA Power announced plans to invest around $10 Billion in over 10 countries. The company already operates in 12 countries, the announcement marks their intent to enter in five new countries including Ethiopia, Tunisia, Cambodia, Azerbaijan and Uzbekistan. The announcement came at the backdrop of winning renewable energy projects in Azerbaijan and Ethiopia.

In order to support the renewable energy in Saudi Arabia, The Public Investment Fund announced in November 2020 that it has increased its stake in ACWA Power to 50% from 33.6%.

Bokpoort Independent Power Project, South Africa 
 The Bokpoort CSP project, a 50 MW concentrated solar power plant with 9.3 hours thermal storage, was inaugurated in March 2016, after operations started in December 2015.
 In April 2016 the Bokpoort CSP plant set a new African record for the continuous, round the clock supply of electricity by generating power for a continuous period of 161 hours.

Noor I, II, III, IV Ouarzazate, Morocco 
The Noor solar complex with 580 MW solar CSP and PV near Ouarzazate is the largest in the world in 2019. ACWA was involved in all 4 plants.
In 2012, a consortium led by ACWA Power won a €634m euro contract to build a 160 MW Concentrated Solar Power plant near Ouarzazate, Morocco – called Noor I. The cost of the project when it began operations was $3.9 billion. The electricity was to be sold at $0.19 /kWh.
 In 2015, ACWA Power were awarded a €1.7 billion contract for two further solar power projects, Noor II and Noor III, in Morocco.
 Noor I was inaugurated in February 2016 and will generate 160 MW of electricity. The second two phases currently under construction will generate a further 580 MW.
 Noor IV construction was launched in April 2017 to add an additional capacity of 72MWp (photovoltaics)

Nam Dinh, Vietnam 
 In June 2014 a consortium including ACWA Power and Korea's Taekwang Power Holdings Company Limited signed an agreement to develop the Nam Dinh 1 IPP Project in Vietnam.
 In January 2016, the consortium signed a $2.2 billion investment agreement with Vietnam for the Nam Dinh 1 thermal power plant. The $2 billion coal fired power plant will generate 1,200MW upon completion.

According to the Revised Power Development Plan VII (2016), the current status of the project is as follows:

 Phase I, Unit 1 - 600 MW - Planned with Investor identified (i.e. pre-permit development) - Year 2020
 Phase I, Unit 2 - 600 MW - Planned with Investor identified (i.e. pre-permit development) - Year 2021
 Phase II, Unit 1 - 600 MW - Cancelled
 Phase II, Unit 2 - 600 MW - Cancelled

Hassyan, UAE 
 In September 2014 ACWA Power was shortlisted to build the Hassyan 2,400MW coal power plant with pollution mitigation as part of a $20 billion investment by the UAE Government that aims to help to diversify Dubai's energy mix by 2030.
 In October 2015, a consortium including ACWA Power and China's Harbin Electric were selected to build and operate the $1.8 billion plant.
 Construction of the power plant commenced in November 2016. The four units of 600MW each are expected to start operations in 2020, 2021, 2022 and 2023 respectively.

Sheikh Mohammed bin Rashid al-Maktoum Solar Park, Dubai 
 In January 2015 a consortium of ACWA Power and Spain's TSK were selected by Dubai Electricity and Water Authority (DEWA) as the preferred bidder to build the $327 million phase 2 project of the Sheikh Mohammed bin Rashid al-Maktoum Solar Park in the emirate.
 In March 2015, ACWA Power secured a $344 million loan to finance the project.
 The Dubai Electricity and Water Authority (DEWA) signed a Power Purchase Agreement and a Shareholder Agreement with ACWA Power in March 2015 for the 200MW expansion.
 ACWA Power's tender for construction of the project, at a tariff of 5.98 USD cents/kWh, was the cheapest ever offered in the world. This tariff was later surpassed in 2017 by the 500 MW Bhadla solar park auction in India at 3.80 USD cents/kWh.

Redstone Solar Thermal Power Project, South Africa 
 In January 2015 a consortium led by ACWA Power and the USA firm SolarReserve was awarded the right to develop the $1.2 billion Redstone Solar Thermal Power Project in the Northern Cape Province, South Africa. It is a 100 MW concentrating solar power generation project utilizing central tower technology with 12 hours of full-load energy storage, able to deliver a stable electricity supply to more than 200,000 South African homes. Basic power tariff offered is  $124/MW·h and peak power tariff is 270% of the basic power tariff i.e. $334/MW·h.
 In October 2015 financing was secured for the Redstone project when the Overseas Private Investment Corporation (OPIC) signed an agreement to making a US$400mn commitment of debt financing.
As of 2022 the plant is under construction and scheduled for completion in Q4 2023.

Awards 
ACWA Power won the following awards in 2014:
 The Acquisition International Fund awards:  Energy Investment Firm of the Year – Saudi Arabia, a vanity award
 MEED quality awards: Angus Hindley Award for Project Excellence

References 

Electric power companies of Saudi Arabia
Companies based in Riyadh
Renewable energy companies of Asia
Non-renewable resource companies established in 2004
Saudi Arabian companies established in 2004